Islah Abdur-Rahman (born 20 April 1991) is a British Bangladeshi film director, actor, singer and screenwriter. He is best known for writing, directing and starring in the hit series, the Corner Shop Show and for creating and directing the web series Mandem in the Wall.

Early life
Abdur-Rahman was born in England to Bengali Muslim parents from Balaganj in Sylhet District, Bangladesh. He attended Forest Hill School and studied business, ICT and history. After completing his GCSEs, he took a BTEC media studies course in Hillsyde Sixth Form. He carried on media and film studies through AS level, then did A levels in media, English language and ICT, then studied for a foundation degree in art and design at Croydon College. In 2013, he graduated with a 2:1 degree in television and new media broadcasting with media & cultural studies from Kingston University.

Career
In March 2011, whilst studying at university, Abdur-Rahman launched his own film production company – IAR Media. In 2011, amongst various client jobs, he created and directed Mandem on the Wall known for its role in the E4 drama series Youngers. In the beginning of 2013, he starred in the feature film Those Four Walls, co-starring Kulvinder Ghir, Rakhee Thakrar, Antony Costa, Juggy D, directed by Ameet Chana. In April 2014 he directed and presented a documentary called British By Dissent which had its own screening and television debut. Since February 2014, he has created, directed, written, starred in the comedy series Corner Shop Show. In 2018, the comedy group known as 'The Halalians' was formed. In December 2018, Abdur-Rahman performed at the Great Muslim Panto 2018, alongside comedians and actors such as Abdullah Afzal, Once Upon A Family and Inayat Kanji. He performed at over 25 cities such as London, Cardiff and Bradford. He was one of the main actors and had meet and greet sessions with fans.

Filmography

See also
 List of British Bangladeshis

References

External links
 
 Islah and Mehreen Baig (BBC Asian Network)
 IAR Media website
 

1991 births
Living people
English Sunni Muslims
English people of Bangladeshi descent
English film directors
English male actors
English male web series actors
21st-century English male actors
Male actors from London
English YouTubers
People educated at Forest Hill School
Alumni of Croydon College
Alumni of Kingston University
People from Balaganj Upazila
A cappella musicians
21st-century Bangladeshi musicians
Bangladeshi male musicians
Bangladeshi songwriters
Bangladeshi lyricists
Bengali-language lyricists
21st-century male musicians
21st-century Bengalis